Rózsika Rothschild (born Rózsika Edle von Wertheimstein; Nagyvárad, Austria-Hungary, 15 October 1870 – London, 30 June 1940) was a tennis player and the wife of the banker and entomologist Charles Rothschild.

Life 
She was born as Rózsika Edle von Wertheimstein in Nagyvárad, Austria-Hungary (now Oradea, Romania). She grew up as one of seven children of an officer of the Austro-Hungarian army, Alfred Edler von Wertheimstein. The Wertheimstein family was the one of the first Jewish families in Europe to be ennobled without having previously converted to Christianity. The multi-lingual Rózsika was regarded as very interested in politics. Around the turn of the century she was a very well known tennis player and national Hungarian champion. However, tennis was then almost exclusively operated by the nobility.  

She was married in Vienna on 6 February 1907 to Charles Rothschild, son of Nathan Mayer Rothschild, 1st Baron Rothschild from the English branch of the Rothschild family, whom she had met during a butterfly excursion in the Carpathians (other sources indicate that it was a tennis court in Karlsbad). The couple lived on his estate in Tring, Hertfordshire. After the early death of her husband in 1923, she raised her four children alone.

See also 
 Miriam Louisa Rothschild (1908–2005), zoologist
 Victor Nathaniel Mayer Victor Rothschild (1910–1990), biologist, cricket player and Labour Party member
 Kathleen Annie Pannonica Rothschild (1913–1988), named  Nica, and after her marriage Baroness Pannonica de Koenigswarter, jazz patron

References

External links 
 Biographical details on Geneanet

Rozsika
1870 births
1940 deaths
People from Oradea
Austro-Hungarian Jews
Edlers of Austria